Tangshuia is a genus of flowering plants belonging to the family Rubiaceae.

Its native range is Taiwan.

Species:

Tangshuia pitouchaoensis

References

Rubiaceae
Rubiaceae genera